The Australian Champion Sprinter is awarded annually to the Thoroughbred horse whose performances in Australia over distances between 1000m and 1400m are deemed to be the superior to other horses.
It has been awarded since the 1998 - 1999 season.

Other Australian Thoroughbred Awards
Australian Champion Racehorse of the Year
Australian Champion Two Year Old
Australian Champion Three Year Old
Australian Champion Middle Distance Racehorse
Australian Champion Stayer
Australian Champion Filly or Mare
Australian Champion International Performer
Australian Champion Jumper
Australian Champion Trainer

See also

 List of millionaire racehorses in Australia

References

Australian Thoroughbred racing awards